Stephenson 2 DFK 1 (abbreviated to RSGC2-01), also known as Stephenson 2-18 (abbreviated to St2-18), is an enigmatic red supergiant (RSG) or possible extreme red hypergiant (RHG) star in the constellation of Scutum. It is among the largest known stars, one of the most luminous red supergiants, and one of the most luminous stars in the Milky Way.

Taking this estimate as correct, it would take nearly 9 hours to travel around its surface at the speed of light, compared to 14.5 seconds for the Sun. If placed at the center of Earth's Solar System, its photosphere would engulf the orbit of Saturn.

Observation history

The open cluster Stephenson 2 was discovered by American astronomer Charles Bruce Stephenson in 1990 in the data obtained by a deep infrared survey.  The cluster is also known as RSGC2, one of several massive open clusters in Scutum, each containing multiple red supergiants.

The brightest star in the region of the cluster was given the identifier 1 in the first analysis of cluster member properties.  However, it was not considered to be a member of Stephenson 2 due to its outlying position, abnormally high brightness, and slightly atypical proper motion, instead being categorized as an unrelated red supergiant.

In a later study, the same star was given the number 18 and assigned to an outlying group of stars called Stephenson 2 SW, assumed to be at a similar distance to the core cluster.  The designation St2-18 (short for Stephenson 2-18) is often used for the star, following the numbering from Deguchi (2010).  To avoid confusion from using the same number for different stars and different numbers for the same star, designations from Davies (2007) are often given a prefix of DFK or D, for example Stephenson 2 DFK 1 or simply D1 where the context is clear.

In 2012, Stephenson 2 DFK 1, along with 56 other red supergiants, was observed in a study regarding the maser emissions from red supergiants across the galaxy. The study derived the properties of those red supergiants using the Australia Telescope Compact Array (ATCA) and the DUSTY model. Stephenson 2 DFK 1 was among the red supergiants mentioned. 
That same year, it was observed yet again for a study regarding the types of masers on red supergiant stars in clusters. 
During 2013, in a study regarding the red supergiants in Stephenson 2, Stephenson 2 DFK 1 (referred to as D1) was observed.
In several later studies, the star was described as being a "very late-type red supergiant".

It was also noted in Humphreys et al. (2020), albeit mistakenly referred to as RSGC1-01, another large and luminous red supergiant in the constellation of Scutum.

Distance

This greater distance was calculated by the assumption that the cluster stars were all M-type supergiants, then calculating the distance modulus based on their typical absolute magnitudes.

In 2001, Nakaya et al. estimated the distance of the stars in the cluster to be 1.5 kiloparsecs (4,900 light-years), which is significantly closer than any other distance estimate given for the star and the cluster. Alternatively, a study around a similar timeframe gave a further distance of roughly 5.9 kiloparsecs (19,000 light-years). A study in 2007 determined a kinematic distance of  kiloparsecs ( light-years) from comparison with the cluster's radial velocity, considerably closer than the original distance of 30 kiloparsecs (98,000 light-years) quoted by Stephenson (1990). However, because of Stephenson 2 DFK 1's doubtful membership, its distance was not directly estimated. This value was later adopted in a recent study of the cluster.

A similar kinematic distance of 5.5 kiloparsecs (18,000 light-years) was reported in a 2010 study, derived from the average radial velocity of four of the cluster's members (96 kilometers per second) and from an association with a clump of stars near Stephenson 2, Stephenson 2 SW, locating it near the Scutum–Centaurus Arm of the Milky Way. This value was later adopted in a 2012 study, which used the aforementioned distance to calculate the star's luminosity, however noted that the uncertainty in the distance was greater than 50%. Despite this, it is also stated that distances to massive star clusters will be improved in the future.

Verheyen et al. (2013) used the average radial velocity of the cluster (+109.3 ± 0.7 kilometers per second) to derive a kinematic distance of roughly 6 kiloparsecs (20,000 light-years) for the cluster. However, Stephenson 2 DFK 1's radial velocity is calculated to be only 89 kilometers per second and therefore leading to the study's statement that the star is a field red supergiant unassociated with the cluster.

Physical properties

Evolutionary stage

RSGC2-01 shows the traits and properties of a highly luminous red supergiant, with a spectral type of M6, which is unusual for a supergiant star. This makes it one of the most extreme stars in the Milky Way. It occupies the top right corner of the Hertzsprung–Russell diagram, a region characterized for exceptionally large and luminous low-temperature stars.

Stephenson 2 DFK 1 is usually classified as a red supergiant, partly due to its broad line profile. However, its significant infrared excess has led the authors of Davies (2007) to state that the star might be a red hypergiant, like VY Canis Majoris. It is also stated that Stephenson 2 DFK 1 is on the brink of ejecting its outer layers and evolving into a luminous blue variable (LBV) or Wolf–Rayet star (WR star).

Luminosity

However, it has been noted that its SED is somewhat peculiar, with fluxes that couldn't fit with the accepted range of appropriate temperatures for an RSG as well as a standard reddening law. This would suggest a higher extinction, which would make it be even more luminous. Because of this unusually high luminosity, the star's membership to the Stephenson 2 cluster has been considered doubtful. 
As stated in Negueruela et al. (2012), the stellar association is spread over a large area, with Stephenson 2 blending into the surrounding area.

Temperature

Spectral type
In 2007, Davies et al. estimated Stephenson 2 DFK 1's spectral type at M5 or M6, unusual and very late for even a red supergiant star, based on its CO-bandhead absorption.
Negueruela et al. (2013) similarly identified Stephenson 2 DFK 1's spectral type to be around M6, based on its spectrum and the characteristics of certain spectral features, such as titanium oxide (TiO) spectral lines.

Size

Assuming this value is correct, this would make it larger than other famous red supergiants, such as Antares A, Betelgeuse, VY Canis Majoris and UY Scuti.

Mass loss

It is possible that Stephenson 2 DFK 1 underwent an extreme mass loss episode recently, due to its significant infrared excess.

In 2013, an article describing the red supergiants in Stephenson 2 stated that Stephenson 2 DFK 1 (referred to as D1) and D2 (another member of Stephenson 2) have maser emissions, indicating that they have the highest mass loss in the cluster. Only the stars with the highest bolometric luminosities in the cluster seem to present maser emissions. Stephenson 2 DFK 1 displays strong silicate emission, especially at wavelengths of 10 μm and 18 μm. Water masers were detected in the star as well.

Membership

It has been debated for a while if this star is actually part of its supposed cluster. Due to its radial velocity being below the other cluster stars but with some spectrum-derived indications showing signs of membership, some sources state that the star is unlikely to be a foreground giant; however, more recent papers considered the star an unlikely member due to its extreme and inconsistent properties.
Using radial velocities determined from SiO maser emission and IR CO absorption, a study of red supergiant masers in massive clusters considered Stephenson 2 DFK 1 as a field red supergiant, unrelated to Stephenson 2. This is due to its lower radial velocity that is significantly different compared to other stars from Stephenson 2. Despite this, Stephenson 2 DFK 1's membership cannot be ruled out yet. 

Another possibility is that Stephenson 2 DFK 1 is actually a member, because its radial velocity is offset by an expanding optically thick envelope. The velocity difference between this star’s radial velocity and Stephenson 2 itself (20 kilometers per second) is a typical outflow speed for red supergiants. Another study says that Stephenson 2 DFK 1 is part of a cluster related to Stephenson 2, Stephenson 2 SW, which is assumed to be at the same distance as the core cluster itself. This proposed cluster contains several other massive stars and red supergiants, including Stephenson 2 DFK 49.

Uncertainty

The star's doubtful membership, uncertain distance and differing radial velocities compared to the rest of the stars in Stephenson 2 have led to some authors to consider the star as a red supergiant unrelated to Stephenson 2 or any of the red supergiant clusters at the base of the Scutum–Centaurus Arm.

See also

Notes

References

M-type supergiants
Scutum (constellation)
J18390238-0605106
IRAS catalogue objects
TIC objects
M-type hypergiants